The women's water polo tournament at the 2011 World Aquatics Championships, organised by the FINA, was held in Shanghai, China from 17 to 29 July 2011.

Qualification

†

Preliminary round

The draw for the competition was held on April 15, 2011.

Group A
All times are CST (UTC+8)

Group B
All times are CST (UTC+8)

Group C
All times are CST (UTC+8)

Group D
All times are CST (UTC+8)

Final rounds

Quarterfinals qualification
All times are CST (UTC+8)

Championship bracket

5th place bracket

9th place bracket

13th place bracket

13th-16th place classification
All times are CST (UTC+8)

Quarterfinals
All times are CST (UTC+8)

9th-12th place classification 
All times are CST (UTC+8)

15th place match
All times are CST (UTC+8)

13th place match
All times are CST (UTC+8)

5th-8th place classification
All times are CST (UTC+8)

Semifinals
All times are CST (UTC+8)

11th place match
All times are CST (UTC+8)

9th place match
All times are CST (UTC+8)

7th place match
All times are CST (UTC+8)

5th place match
All times are CST (UTC+8)

Bronze medal match
All times are CST (UTC+8)

Gold medal match
All times are CST (UTC+8)

Ranking and statistics

Final ranking

Team Roster
Eleni Kouvdou, Christina Tsoukala, Antiopi Melidoni, Ilektra Psouni, Kyriaki Liosi (C), Alkisti Avramidou, Alexandra Asimaki, Antigoni Roumpesi, Angeliki Gerolymou, Triantafyllia Manolioudaki, Stavroula Antonakou, Georgia Lara, Eleni Goula. Head Coach: Giorgos Morfesis

Awards

Most Valuable Player
 Ma Huanhuan

Best Goalscorer
 Blanca Gil – 25 goals

Media All-Star Team
 Eleni Kouvdou – Goalkeeper
 Sun Yating – Centre forward
 Ma Huanhuan
 Blanca Gil
 Antigoni Roumpesi
 Ekaterina Prokofyeva
 Roberta Bianconi

References

External links
Official website
Records and statistics (reports by Omega)

2011
Women's tournament
2011 in women's water polo
Women's water polo in China
2011 in Chinese women's sport